The Kakanj Coal Mine is a coal mine located in the Zenica-Doboj Canton.   The mine has coal reserves amounting to 440 million tonnes of lignite, one of the largest coal reserves in Europe and the world. The mine has an annual production capacity of 0.9 million tonnes of coal.

See also 
1934 Kakanj mine disaster
1965 Kakanj mine disaster

References 

Coal mines in Bosnia and Herzegovina
Kakanj